AJ Alatimu (born 25 March 1993) is a Samoan rugby union player who plays for the Seattle Seawolves of Major League Rugby (MLR) in the United States. His position of choice is fly-half.

He also played for Western Force in the World Series Rugby competition.

On 23 August 2019, he was named in Samoa's 34-man training squad for the 2019 Rugby World Cup, before being named in the final 31 on 31 August.

References

External links 

Samoan rugby union players
1993 births
Living people
Samoa international rugby union players
Rugby union fly-halves
Rugby union centres
Rugby union fullbacks
Perth Spirit players
Brisbane City (rugby union) players
Western Force players
Seattle Seawolves players
Counties Manukau rugby union players